Peleș Castle is a Neo-Renaissance castle in the Carpathian Mountains, near Sinaia, in Prahova County, Romania, on an existing medieval route linking Transylvania and Wallachia, built between 1873 and 1914. Its inauguration was held in 1883.  It was constructed for King Carol I.

Location
In the southeastern Carpathian Mountains, the complex is composed of three monuments: Peleș Castle, Pelișor Castle, and the Foișor Hunting Lodge.

History

When King Carol I of Romania (1839–1914), under whose reign the country gained its independence, first visited the site of the future castle in 1866, he fell in love with the magnificent mountain scenery. In 1872, the Crown purchased  of land near the Piatra Arsă River. The estate was named the Royal Estate of Sinaia. The King commissioned the construction of a royal hunting preserve and summer retreat on the property, and the foundation was laid for Peleș Castle on 22 August 1873. Several auxiliary buildings were built simultaneously with the castle: the guards' chambers, the Economat Building, the Foișor hunting lodge, the royal stables, and a power plant. Peleș became the world's first castle fully powered by locally produced electricity.

The first three design plans submitted for Peleș were copies of other palaces in Western Europe, and King Carol I rejected them all as lacking originality and being too costly. German architect Johannes Schultz won the project by presenting a more original plan, something that appealed to the King's taste: a grand palatial alpine castle combining different features of classic European styles, mostly following Italian elegance and German aesthetics along Renaissance lines. Works were also led by architect Carol Benesch. The Sipot Building, which served as Liman's headquarters during the construction, was built later on. Liman would supervise the building of the nearby Pelișor Castle (1889–1903, the future residence of King Ferdinand I and Queen Marie of Romania), as well as of King Ferdinand's villa in the Royal Sheepfold Meadow. King Carol I and Queen Elizabeth lived in Foişor Villa during construction, as King Ferdinand and Queen Marie had during the construction of Pelișor Castle. 

The cost of the work on the castle undertaken between 1875 and 1914 was estimated to be 16,000,000 Romanian lei in gold (approx. US$ 120 million today). Between three and four hundred men worked on the construction. Queen Elisabeth of the Romanians, during the construction phase, wrote in her journal:

Construction saw a slight slowdown during the Romanian War of Independence against the Ottoman Empire in 1877–78, but soon afterwards the plans grew in size and construction was quite rapid. 

Peleș Castle had its official Royal Ball of Inauguration on 7 October 1883. King Carol II was born at the castle in 1893, giving meaning to the phrase "cradle of the dynasty, cradle of the nation" that Carol I bestowed upon Peleș Castle. Carol II lived in Foișor Villa for periods during his reign. Princess Maria died there in 1874.

After King Michael I's forced abdication in 1947, the Communist regime seized all royal property, including the Peleș Estate. The castle was opened as a tourist attraction for a short time. It also served as a recreation and resting place for Romanian cultural personalities. The castle was declared a museum in 1953. Nicolae Ceaușescu closed the entire estate between 1975 and 1990, during the last years of the Communist regime. The area was declared a "State Protocol Interest Area", and the only persons permitted on the property were maintenance and military personnel.

Ceaușescu did not like the castle very much and rarely visited. In the 1980s, some of the timber was infested with Serpula lacrymans. After the December 1989 Revolution, Peleș and Pelișor Castle were re-established as heritage sites and opened to the public. Today, Foișor Castle serves as a presidential residence. The Economat Building and the Guard's Chambers Building are now hotels and restaurants. Some of the other buildings on the Peleș Estate were converted to tourist villas and some are now "state protocol buildings". In 2006, the Romanian government announced the restitution of the castle to former monarch Michael I. Negotiations soon began between the former king and the government of Romania, and were concluded in 2007. The castle is on lease from the royal family to the Romanian state. Peleș Castle receives between a quarter and almost a half million visitors annually.

Throughout its history, the castle hosted some important personalities, from royalty and politicians to artists. One of the most memorable visits was that of Kaiser Franz Joseph I of Austria-Hungary on 2 October 1896, who later wrote in a letter:

Artists like George Enescu, Sarah Bernhardt, Jacques Thibaud and Vasile Alecsandri visited often as guests of Queen Elizabeth of Romania (herself a writer also known under the pen name of Carmen Sylva). In more recent times, many foreign dignitaries such as Richard Nixon, Gerald Ford, Muammar al-Gaddafi, and Yasser Arafat were welcomed at the castle.

The castle was featured in the 2009 film The Brothers Bloom. The exterior of the castle is used to represent a large estate in New Jersey, the home of an eccentric billionaire played by Rachel Weisz.

The castle was featured in the Netflix original film A Christmas Prince and its two sequels, A Christmas Prince: The Royal Wedding and A Christmas Prince: The Royal Baby. It was also featured in the 2011 Hallmark Channel movie A Princess for Christmas and 2018's Royal Matchmaker.

Description
By form and function, Peleș is a palace, but it is consistently called a castle. Its architectural style is a romantically inspired blend Neo-Renaissance and Gothic Revival similar to Neuschwanstein Castle in Bavaria. A Saxon influence can be observed in the interior courtyard facades, which have allegorical hand-painted murals and ornate fachwerk similar to that seen in northern European alpine architecture. Interior decoration is mostly Baroque influenced, with heavy carved woods and exquisite fabrics.

Peleș Castle has a  floor plan with over 170 rooms, many with dedicated themes from world cultures (in a similar fashion as other Romanian palaces, such as Cotroceni Palace). Themes vary by function (offices, libraries, armouries, art galleries) or by style (Florentine, Turkish, Moorish, French, Imperial); all the rooms are lavishly furnished and decorated to the slightest detail. There are 30 bathrooms. The establishment has collections of statues, paintings, furniture, arms and armor, gold, silver, stained glass, ivory, porcelain, tapestries and rugs. The collection of arms and armour has over 4,000 pieces, divided between Eastern and Western war pieces and ceremonial or hunting pieces, spreading over four centuries of history. Oriental rugs come from many sources: Bukhara, Mosul, Isparta, Saruk and Smirna. The porcelain is from Sèvres and Meissen; the leather is from Córdoba. The hand-painted stained glass vitralios, which are mostly Swiss.

A towering statue of King Carol I by Raffaello Romanelli overlooks the main entrance. Many other statues are present on the seven Italian neo-Renaissance terrace gardens, mostly of Carrara marble executed by the Italian sculptor Romanelli. The gardens also host fountains, urns, stairways, guarding lions, marble paths and other decorative pieces.

Peleș Castle shelters a painting collection of almost 2,000 pieces. Angelo de Gubernatis (1840–1913) was an Italian writer who arrived in 1898 in Sinaia as a guest of the Royal Family:

Museum

Public visits are made within guided tours. One of the tours is limited to the ground floor, another adds the first floor and the complete tour includes the second floor. Admission is charged, and there is an additional photography fee. The visiting hours are from 9 am to 5 pm; Wednesday through Sunday. On Tuesdays, the hours are 11 am to 5 pm. The castle is closed on Mondays. These visiting hours are subject to change by the Romanian Culture Ministry. The castle is closed in November each year for maintenance and cleaning.

The most notable grand rooms are:

Holul de Onoare (The Hall of Honour) was finished completely only in 1911, under the guidance of Karel Liman. It spreads over three floors. Walls are dressed in exquisitely carved woodwork, mostly European walnut and exotic timbers. Bas-reliefs, alabaster sculptures, and retractable stained glass panels complete the decor.

Apartamentul Imperial (The Imperial Suite) is believed to be a tribute to the Austrian Emperor Franz Joseph I, who visited the palace as a friend of the Romanian Royal Family.  Hence, decorator Auguste Bembe preferred the sumptuous Austrian Baroque in style of Empress Maria Theresa.  A perfectly preserved five-hundred-year-old Cordoban tooled leather wall cover is the rarest of such quality.

Sala Mare de Arme (The Grand Armory or The Arsenal) is where 1,600 of the 4,000 pieces of weaponry and armor reside. One of Europe's finest collection of hunting and war implements, timelined between 14th and 19th century, are on display. The king added pieces used in his victory against the Ottoman Turks during the War of Independence. Famous are the complete Maximilian armor for horse and rider and a 15th-century German "nobles only" decapitation broadsword. Also on display are a wide array of polearms (glaives, halberds, lances, hunting spears), firearms (muskets, blunderbusses, snaphaunces, flintlocks, pistols), axes, crossbows, and swords (rapiers, sabers, broadswords, and many others).

Sala Mică de Arme (The Small Armory) is where predominantly Oriental (mostly Indo-Persian, Ottoman and Arab) arms and armor pieces are on exhibit, many of them made of gold and silver, and inlaid with precious stones. Included are chainmail armor, helmets, scimitars, yataghans, daggers, matchlocks, lances, pistols, shields, axes, and spears.

Sala de Teatru (The Playhouse) is decorated in Louis XIV style, with sixty seats and a Royal Box. Architectural decoration and mural paintings are signed by Gustav Klimt and Frantz Matsch.

Sala Florentină (The Florentine Room) combines revived elements of the Italian Renaissance, mostly from Florence. Most impressive are the solid bronze doors executed in Rome; ateliers of Luigi Magni; and the Grand Marble Fireplace executed by Paunazio with Michelangelo motifs.

Salonul Maur (The Moorish Salon) was executed under the guidance of Charles Lecompte de Nouy, and is meant to embody elements of North-African and Hispanic Moorish style. Mother-of-pearl inlaid furniture, fine Persian Sarouk and Ottoman Isparta rugs, and Oriental weapons and armor are perhaps the most expressive elements. The salon has an indoor marble fountain.

Salonul Turcesc (The Turkish Parlor) emulates an Ottoman "joie de vivre" atmosphere—a room full of Turkish Izmir rugs and copperware from Anatolia and Persia. It was used as a smoking room for gentlemen. Walls are covered in hand-made textiles like silk brocades from the Siegert shops of Vienna.

In something remarkable in comparison to most recent-era royal families, the monarchs shared a bedroom.

Present day

Originally personal property of the Royal Family, Peleș Castle was nationalized when King Michael I was forced to abdicate and into exile by the Communist government in 1947. In 1997, the castle was returned to the Royal Family in a long judicial case that was finally concluded in 2007. Michael I subsequently said the castle should continue to house the Peleș National Museum, as well as being occasionally used for public royal ceremonies.

Michael I's heir Margareta, Custodian of the Romanian Crown occasionally uses the Castle for receptions, investitures and other public events. On 10 May (Monarchy Day) 2016, the Royal Family hosted a large Reception, Garden Party & Concert at Peleș Castle to mark the 150th anniversary of the Romanian Royal Dynasty, where Margareta's standard was flown from Peleș Castle—the first time since 1947 that a Royal Standard had flown from the Castle.

In August 2016, the body of Queen Anne Lay in State in the Hall of Honour at Peleș Castle in a ceremony attended by the Presidents of Romania and Moldova, as well as Prime Minister Dacian Cioloș and other national leaders. This was followed on 13 December 2017 by King Michael I Lying in State in the same location in a similar, but larger, ceremony prior to his funeral in Bucharest and burial in Curtea de Argeș.

See also

 List of castles in Romania
 Seven Wonders of Romania
 Tourism in Romania 
 Villages with fortified churches in Transylvania

References

External links 

 
 Peleș Royal Heritage Association - NGO dedicated to protecting, conserving, restoring and enhancing the Peleș Royal Estate.

Castles in Romania
Sinaia
Historic house museums in Romania
Museums in Prahova County
Royal residences in Romania
Buildings and structures in Prahova County
Renaissance Revival architecture in Romania
Historic monuments in Prahova County
1914 establishments in Romania